Seagulls Island is an islet in the Río de la Plata, on the shores of Montevideo, Uruguay (at a distance of 300 m from the coastline).

It is a birdwatching site, with the following species recorded:
 Ardeola ibis 
 Casmerodius albus
 Columba livia
 Egretta thula
 Fregata magnificens
 Fulica armillata
 Haematopus palliatus
 Larus dominicanus
 Chroicocephalus maculipennis 
 Nycticorax nycticorax 
 Nannopterum brasilianum 
 Pitangus sulphuratus
 Tyrannus savana 
 Macronectes giganteus

References

External links
 Seagulls Island

Malvín
River islands of Uruguay
Islands of the Río de la Plata
Birdwatching sites in Uruguay